Sportiva Calcio Adelaide commonly referred to as Adelaide or the abbreviation S.C. Adelaide, is a Ghanaian professional football club based in Tema, Greater Accra, who are competing in the Ghana Division Three League. The club has spent most of their history as a youth football team, but recently converted into a senior team in second tier of the Ghana Football Leagues. Adelaide was initially started as a football club, as a club oriented to multiple sports. Adelaide has departments for athletics, basketball, football, handball, swimming, volleyball, and others. Their motto is Deo Juvante (Latin) meaning with God's Help.

History

The club was founded as a sporting club in 1995 as an organization to aid the youth in the community to get into sports. It was named after St Adelaide of Italy (thus the Italian connection Sportiva Calcio Adelaide). Adelaide means Noble kind; of the noble sort, and this was what the organization set out to do to the community. "The opening of the club is with an aim to developing talents and to raise up a generation who will be brave enough to face the world practically and make the nation and the continent as a whole proud." In honor of its origins, the club has retained the Italian name as Sportiva Calcio Adelaide, instead of changing it to the Adelaide Sporting Club, the S.C. is in front of the Adelaide and not after, which is sometimes confused since more sporting activities are being taken.

Colours and Badge
Throughout the entire history of the club, they have been represented by the colour blue and white. The colours have two representations, firstly psychics who claim to be able to observe the aura with their third eye report that someone with a blue aura is a person who is oriented toward spirituality. People with blue auras are said to be interested in social service work and to be in occupations such as social worker, counsellor, teacher, writer, and psychologist. due to the aim of the organization. Secondly with its Italian connection, Azzurro (meaning sky), a light blue, is the national colour of Italy as such Adelaide's blue jersey, they have gained the nickname Azzurri. White was chosen because White was the symbol of Catholics, white means purity. Blue jerseys are used for home matches and white jerseys for away matches. The team also wears a third jersey aqua (cyan colour) for matches on neutral grounds, when the opposition wears white or on holiday games. The bashers (bashing is a term meaning thumping) another nickname came from the team's thumping of their opposition. The nickname also comes from the municipality Tema which used to be a land of calabashes (Tema originated from ' Tor-man ' in Ga meaning calabash-town).

Stadium
The team's current home grounds is a 10,000 capacity park – Christ Church, in the district of Ningo Prampram where it's located. There is ambiguity with the origin of the name, it was named after the many catholic cathedrals, it is also believed the name was given as a place for rejoicing for the fans where they will go and enjoy themselves from the football.

Approach and Philosophy
S.C. Adelaide has been described as a team which has a desire to entertain and attack, their style of play has been likened to Arsenal F.C. style of playing, quick one two passes, through passes and the odd one or two long passes. Others interpret their style as Total football due to their Dutch coach nicknamed the "Dutchmaster". "If you are looking to watch total football by the Netherlands national football team or looking to watch Arsenal F.C. live and not on TV look no further, just watch S.C. Adelaide, how do they do it" – Kalusha, sports presenter on Peace FM Ghana . The club focuses on and is dedicated to developing individual and collective technical ability, ball control, possession, passing and defending.

S.C. Adelaide are very successful on the youth level at unearthing talent because their chief scout Seth Hoffmann is the under – 12 and under – 17 southern sector scout for the Ghana Football Association, most of their best players especially the under – 12's are brought through the club before they are even scouted by other clubs. Their recruitment of the best talents and training methods has led to them producing players described as world class. Examples are Ransford Osei a striker described by FIFA.com as "an opportunistic goal machine" with superb pace and movement, young free-scoring sensation Osei was recognized by World Soccer Magazine as one of the 50 Most Exciting Teenagers on the Planet in their November 2007 Issue. Daniel Opare also was recognized by World Soccer Magazine as one of the 50 Most Exciting Teenagers on the Planet in their November 2007 Issue, young marauding right wingback Opare received rave reviews for using his incredible pace and precision crossing to great effect for Ghana's U-17 Team, The Black Starlets at the 2007 U-17 World Cup. David Addy was voted the Young Player of the Year 2008 in Ghana. There is continuous supply of talents from the club, after the 2006–07 youth season, all the first team players were sold to top premier league club youth teams, the likes of Hearts of Oak and Kotoko. The club famously boarded up their Palisade fences at their training grounds to prevent premier league scouts from poaching their players. The hopes and expectations of S.C. Adelaide have always been very high, with their development and gradual progression into the premier league it will not be long before the players are sold directly to foreign clubs and also play for the senior national team.

Statistics and records
Adelaide is one of the most successful youth clubs in Ghana, having produced the most number of European-based players by any youth team in Ghana. A record of 6 players; highest ever representation of a single club for the Under-17 team played in 1999. A total of 17 players have been produced for the under-17 since the club's inception. Most of the players were recruited by premier league clubs into their youth teams and first teams. Eric Bekoe is the club's top goalscorer with 106 goals in all competitions between 2001 and 2004 for the under – 17's followed by Ransford Osei's total of 79 between 2000 and 2002 for the under – 12's. Jimmy Addo is the youngest player to ever play against a senior team at 14 years 2 months. Adelaide holds the record for the most goals in a single season, this includes youth league, national youth cup and colts cup competition, with a total of 124 goals in the 2001–02 season. In the 2001–02 season, Eric Bekoe scored 42 goals in 34 appearances, setting the Ghanaian record in a single season. The most goals scored by a player in a single match is 7 by Saddick Adams, which is also a Ghanaian record, the highest number of goals in a single match was 14 both records in a home match against Hamilton Youth F.C. in the 2003–04 season. They played a total of 32 passes and had possession for about 5 minutes. The Adelaide defense set a new record after going 22 consecutive games without conceding a goal and went unbeaten the whole of the 2007/08 season. A commentator said "they (Adelaide) are protecting their goal like they will all die if the ball hit the post let alone if they conceded a goal".

Youth League: 5
1998–99, 2001–02, 2003–04, 2006–07, 2007–08

Regional Youth Cup: 4
2001–02, 2003–04, 2006–07, 2007–08

Colts Cup Competition: 4
1996-97, 2001–02, 2006–07, 2007–08

Promotion to Second Division: 1
2007-08

S.C. Adelaide has qualified for the 2008/09 second division but is yet to register the club for the season. They qualified as a wild card for the Zone 1 playoffs after winning the youth (Colts Football) league, they were included in one of three playoffs groups which consisted of one of three relegated teams from the second division – Palma F.C. and two first and second placed teams from the third division – Great African United and Techiman Universal Stars respectively. The fielded the youngest team with an average age of a little over 16, including 14-year-old left midfield sensation Jimmy Addo touted the new Ryan Giggs, none of the players was over 17 years.

S.C. Adelaide All Time Best XI

At the close of the League 2007–08 the supporters voted for the all-time best Adelaide XI.

References

Football clubs in Ghana
Association football clubs established in 1995
1995 establishments in Ghana
Tema